Mushimba is a surname. Notable people with the surname include:

 Aaron Mushimba (1946–2014), Namibian businessperson
 Brian Mushimba (born 1974), Zambian engineer
 Kovambo Nujoma (née Mushimba, born 1931), Namibian politician, sister of Aaron

Surnames of African origin